Woodmont may refer to a location in the United States:

 Woodmont, Connecticut
 Woodmont (Washington, D.C.), a neighborhood
 Woodmont, Baltimore County, Maryland
 Woodmont, Montgomery County, Maryland
 Woodmont, Washington County, Maryland
 Woodmont (Gladwyne, Pennsylvania), a U.S. National Historic Landmark, former home of Father Divine